Louis-Charles-Élie-Amanien Decazes de Glücksbierg, 2nd Duke Decazes and 2nd Duke of Glücksbierg (29 May 1819 – 16 September 1886), was a French diplomat and statesman.

Biography
Louis Decazes was born in Paris, the son of Élie, duc Decazes and his second wife, Wilhelmine de Beaupoil de Saint-Aulaire.

He married, on 3 August 1863, Séverine-Rosalie von Löwenthal (8 January 1845, Vienna - 25 September 1911, La Grave), daughter of Jean, baron von Löwenthal. They had two children, Jean-Élie-Octave-Louis-Sévère-Amanien and Wilhelmine-Egidia-Octavie Decazes.

Between 29 November 1873 and 23 November 1877, Duke Decazes served as Minister of Foreign Affairs in several monarchist governments of the Third Republic in the 1870s. In this role, he was responsible for conducting French foreign policy during the "War in Sight" crisis of 1875, when he managed to secure the support of all the other powers in protecting France from a potential German pre-emptive strike, and during the early stages of the Great Eastern Crisis.

The 2nd Duke Decazes died at Château La Grave.

Honours 
  Grand officier, Légion d'honneur (1876)
  Grand cross, Order of Saint-Charles (20 March 1877)

See also
 List of Ambassadors of France to the United Kingdom

Notes

External links

1819 births
1886 deaths
Politicians from Paris
102
102
Orléanists
French Foreign Ministers
Members of the National Assembly (1871)
Members of the 1st Chamber of Deputies of the French Third Republic
Members of the 2nd Chamber of Deputies of the French Third Republic
19th-century French diplomats
Ambassadors of France to the United Kingdom
Grand Officiers of the Légion d'honneur
Grand Crosses of the Order of Saint-Charles